Manliffe Barrington (19 November 1912 – 1999), was an Irish professional motorcycle racer. He was a two-time winner at the Isle of Man TT races.

Motorcycle racing career
Barrington was born in Monkstown, County Dublin as the son of an official importer for CAV (a predecessor of Lucas) for tractors in Ireland. He first competed in the 1935 Isle of Man TT on an Excelsior, finishing the Senior TT in 11th place at an average race speed of 72.06 mph. Manliffe also occasionally raced cars including finishing 4th at Phoenix Park in 1937 driving a Rapier.

When motorsports activities resumed following the conclusion of the Second World War, Barrington was entered into the 1947 Isle of Man TT races riding a Moto Guzzi sponsored by former TT champion Stanley Woods. The 250 cc Lightweight TT race was won by Barrington in what proved highly controversial circumstances from teammate Maurice Cann. Despite Cann lapping consistently for the whole race at an average race speed of over 74 mph and Barrington at just over 73 mph, the 1947 250cc Lightweight TT Race was awarded to Barrington. Despite a protest to the ACU, the result was allowed to stand as "....in those days of wind-up watches and hand-written records, the officials had under-estimated Barrington's time by a minute."

The first event of the new 1949 Grand Prix motorcycle racing season was the 1949 Isle of Man TT Race. A further race win for Barrington in the new Grand Prix Championship was the 1949 250 cc Lightweight TT race at an average race speed of 77.99 mph again riding a Moto Guzzi.

During practice for the 1952 Senior TT race, Barrington was riding a 500 cc Norton when engine seizure at the left-hand bend before the Barregarrow cross-roads resulted in a crash, and a broken thigh caused his retirement from motorcycle racing.

World Championship results 

(key) (Races in bold indicate pole position; races in italics indicate fastest lap.)

TT Race Wins

TT career summary

1947 Lightweight TT Race Results

Sources

External links
 TT database rider profile iomtt.com
 TT database TT results iomtt.com

Sportspeople from Dún Laoghaire–Rathdown
Irish motorcycle racers
Isle of Man TT riders
125cc World Championship riders
250cc World Championship riders
350cc World Championship riders
500cc World Championship riders
1912 births
1999 deaths